The 106th Infantry Regiment is an infantry regiment of the New York Army National Guard that traces its history to the 10th New York National Guard. During World War II, the 106th served in the Pacific Theater and acted both independently and as parts of larger divisions.

First 106th Infantry

World War I

The 27th Division was organized in November 1917 into a "square division" of the US Army.  It had two infantry brigades (each with two infantry regiments), along with an artillery brigade, machine gun battalions, and headquarters and support units During the reorganization, the 23rd New York Infantry Regiment was converted into the 106th Infantry Regiment, under the command of Col. Franklin W. Ward, and was assigned to the 53rd Infantry Brigade (now the 53rd Troop Command) alongside the 105th Infantry Regiment (former 2nd New York).  When the regiment arrived in France, it had a strength of 3,003 officers and enlisted men, and it was moved into the front lines on 25 June 1918.  The regiment relieved elements of the British 6th Division along the East Poperinghe Line in Belgium, where it remained with the other elements of the 27th Division.  On 31 August 1918, the Ypres-Lys Offensive began, and the 106th Regiment was engaged in the reconnaissance efforts prior to the main battle.  Alongside the 53rd Brigade and the rest of the 27th Division, the 106th attacked German position in the Second Somme Offensive from 24 September to 21 October 1918.This offensive proved to be the decisive action which broke the Hindenburg Line.  The desperate fighting is clearly demonstrated by the actions of Lt. Col. J. Leslie Kincaid, the Judge Advocate of the Division Staff.  From 25–28 September, Lt. Col. Kincaid took command of a leaderless battalion of the 106th Infantry and managed to hold off an enemy counterattack by organizing every man in the battalion including runners, cooks, signalmen, etc., in the defense; he even personally manned a Lewis Gun during the action.  He was awarded the British Distinguished Service Order. On 21 October 1918, the entire division was relieved from front line duty, and returned to the US on 19 March 1919. By the end of its combat action in World War I, the 106th Infantry Regiment suffered 1,955 casualties including 1,496 wounded, 376 killed, and 83 who later died of their wounds.

Interwar period

The 106th Infantry Regiment was reconstituted in the National Guard on 30 December 1920, assigned to the 27th Division, and allotted to the state of New York. The 23rd New York Infantry had been reorganized in 1919-1920, and was redesignated the 106th Infantry on 1 June 1921. The regiment, less the 3rd Battalion, was reorganized and redesignated the 186th Field Artillery Regiment on 1 September 1940 and relieved from the 27th Division. The 3rd Battalion became the 101st Military Police Battalion.

Second 106th Infantry

Interwar period

The 106th Infantry that served in World War II traces its lineage to the 53rd Pioneer Infantry (the former 47th New York Infantry Regiment) that served in World War I. The unit was reorganized in the New York National Guard from March to June 1921 by consolidation with the 10th New York Infantry Regiment, and assigned to the nondivisional 93rd Infantry Brigade. As nondivisional infantry brigades did not factor into US mobilization plans in 1940, the unit was relieved from the brigade on 1 June 1940, and was assigned to the 27th Division on 1 September 1940. The 10th New York was ordered into federal service on 15 October 1940. The regiment was made up of recruits from Upstate New York, divided into 12 companies, with 4 companies per battalion.  Companies A, B, C, and D were recruited from Albany.  Companies E and F came from Binghamton.  Companies F, G, I, and K were recruited from Walton, Oneonta, Mohawk, and Oneida respectively and Companies L and M were filled with soldiers from Utica. Additional Regimental troops were drawn from Catskill, Hudson, and Rome.  The regiment moved to Fort McClellan, Alabama on 23 October. On 11 December 1940, the 10th New York was redesignated the 106th Infantry.

World War II

Due to the restructuring of the United States Army in the early 1940s, the Square Division concept gave way to the Triangular division concept (where three infantry regiments were supported by more versatile elements rather than relying solely on infantry firepower), the 108th Infantry Regiment was released from the 27th Infantry Division's command and was sent to the 40th Infantry Division, and the 106th was itself sent to Hawaii independent of the rest of the division on 10 March 1942.  It was attached to the V Amphibious Corps on 14 December 1943.

Majuro and Eniwetok
The 2nd Battalion (2-106), occupied Majuro Atoll on February 1, 1944 against no resistance, and remained there until it was sent to Oahu for training on 5 March 1944.  The 1st and 3rd Battalions (1-106 and 3-106) were sent to capture the island of Eniwetok on 19 February 1944.  1-106 made a beach assault against weak Japanese resistance, but became bogged down inland where enemy resistance increased in intensity.  3-106, alongside the 22nd Marine Regiment, arrived to reinforce 1-106 and the island was secured on 21 February.

Saipan
The regiment consolidated its three battalions in Hawaii on 13 April 1944, and landed on Saipan on 20 June 1944, five days after the initial invasion.  Here the 106th Infantry Regiment rejoined the rest of its parent unit, the 27th Infantry Division, which had already been fighting on Saipan.  The 106th fought along rough jungle terrain at the base of Mount Tapotchau, which they dubbed "Purple Heart Ridge" and "Death Valley." After many of the Japanese strongpoints had been subdued, the defenders launched a second last ditch Banzai charge, which the 106th was active in defeating.  After departing the island on 4 September 1944, the 106th enjoyed some R&R on Espiritu Santo.

Okinawa
The regiment departed Espirtu Santo for Okinawa on 20 March 1945, and participated alongside the XXIV Corps general attack on the island.  From 11 April to 16 April, the 106th was under the control of the 96th Infantry Division but was returned to the 27th Division's command for the attack on Rotation Ridge.  Working together with the 105th Infantry Regiment, they fought to capture a hill called The Pinnacle, a tall spire of rock, where the Japanese had prepared an intricate defense.  The last action of the 106th Infantry's World War II chronicle occurred when 1-106 repelled a Banzai charge west of the Pinnacle on 22 April 1945.  Following the relief of the division, 2-106 was sent to occupy the island of Ie Shima.  When the war ended, the 106th arrived in Japan for occupation duty on 12 September 1945.  It was eventually inactivated on 31 December 1945.

Notable members

 Monk Eastman New York mobster

References

106
Infantry regiments of the United States Army
Infantry regiments of the United States Army in World War II
United States Army regiments of World War I
Military units and formations established in 1916
Military units and formations disestablished in 1919
Military units and formations established in 1940
Military units and formations disestablished in 1945